The 1952 United States presidential election in Oklahoma took place on November 4, 1952, as part of the 1952 United States presidential election. Voters chose eight electors to the Electoral College, who voted for president and vice president.

Oklahoma was won by Columbia University President Dwight D. Eisenhower (R–New York), running with Senator Richard Nixon, with 54.59 percent of the popular vote, against Adlai Stevenson (D–Illinois), running with Senator John Sparkman, with 45.41 percent of the popular vote.

The electors selected were Jesse Berry of Chandler, J. Kelsey McClure of Oklahoma City, George E. Nobles of Checotah, David G. Reed of Carnagie, Blanche Kay Young and Mary F. Lawson of Oklahoma City, Arch Stout of Wewoka and Earl E. Ridle of Andarko according to The Daily Ardmoreite article of December 13, 1952. All voted, as pledged, for Eisenhower and Nixon.

With his win, Eisenhower became the first Republican presidential candidate since Herbert Hoover in 1928 to win the state.

Results

Results by county

See also
 United States presidential elections in Oklahoma

References

Oklahoma
1952
1952 Oklahoma elections